A hockey stick is a piece of sports equipment used by the players in all the forms of hockey to move the ball or puck (as appropriate to the type of hockey) either to push, pull, hit, strike, flick, steer, launch or stop the ball/puck during play with the objective being to move the ball/puck around the playing area using the stick, and then trying to score.

The word "stick" is a very generic term for the equipment since the different disciplines of hockey require significant differences in both the form and the size of the stick used for it to be effective in the different sports. Field/ice/roller hockey all have a visually similar form of stick with a long shaft or handle which can be held with two hands, and a curved and flattened end; the end and curvature of these sticks are generally the most visible differences between the sticks for these sports. A modern underwater hockey stick bears little resemblance to any field/ice/roller hockey stick, since it is much smaller to enable it to be used exclusively in one hand, and it also has to be produced in one of two colours in order to identify which of the competing teams a player is playing for.

Field hockey 

Field hockey sticks have an end that varies in shape, often depending on the player's position. In general, there are four main variations on the head:

The 'short' is mainly used by players wishing control over the ball, and increase their manoeuvrability. This specific head is most associated with the mid-field position. (or centre for Ice Hockey)

The 'Midi' is used by players who will be hitting the ball often and need to be strong on their 'reverse side'. This specific head is most associated with the striker or 'up-front' position.

The 'Maxi' is similar to the 'Midi' as it has an increased surface area which is useful for hitting. However, its strength allows it to be used much more effectively for stopping the ball. This head is used by 'defenders' and 'attackers'.

The 'J Hook' again has a large surface area. However does not have the effectiveness of the 'Midi' for striking the ball, it has an increased thickness making it ideal for stopping the ball. This head is most commonly used by 'defenders'.
The main brands of sticks include TK, Grays, Slazenger, Byte, Kookaburra, Malik, Dita, Voodoo, Adidas, Gryphon, uber hockey, Woodworm, Brabo, Mercian, Mazon, Zoppo, Tempest, Matador, King Karachi, NedStar, The Indian Maharaja, Stag, Wasa, No Fear, BHP, Taurus, Wasp, Princess, IHSAN, Mohinder, Chryso, Piranha, Rage, Sachin and Edge.

The size of the stick that is most effective for a specific player is judged by that player's height. However 'defenders' often like to have a longer stick than 'attackers' as this can be used for a greater reach when stopping a moving ball. The 'attackers' prefer a shorter stick as it allows greater control of the ball.

Ice hockey 

Ice hockey sticks have traditionally been made from wood, but in recent years, sticks made of more expensive materials such as aluminum, aramid (brands Kevlar, Nomex, Twaron, etc.), fibreglass, carbon fibre, and other composite materials have become common. In addition to weighing less, composite sticks can be manufactured with more consistent flexibility properties than their wooden counterparts. They also do not have the natural variations that wooden sticks possess therefore a batch of the same sticks will all perform roughly the same. There were a few die-hard NHL professionals who still liked the feel of wood sticks as late as 2010, such as Paul Stastny, son of Hall-of-Famer Peter Šťastný. Some of these sticks have replaceable wood or composite blades, while others are one-piece sticks without a replaceable blade. Composite sticks, despite their greater expense, are now commonplace at nearly all competitive levels of the sport, including youth ice hockey. Some of the top brands of composite sticks include Bauer, Easton, Reebok/CCM, and Warrior. These new sticks are lighter and provide a quicker release of the puck, resulting in a harder, more accurate shot.  Although the new materials do enable harder shots, the improved durability and lighter materials can make the transition from wooden to composite stick more difficult for less experienced players. A shortcut used by numerous players is to use a weighted system, such as kwik hands, to quickly adjust to the new sticks. More expensive ice hockey sticks (such as the Bauer Vapor 1X, Bauer Supreme 1S, Bauer Nexus 1N, CCM Ribcor Trigger PMT2, CCM RBZ FT1, CCM Super Tacks 2.0,  Easton Stealth CX, Easton Synergy GX, Warrior Covert QRL, Warrior Alpha QX, Warrior Dynasty HD1) usually are the lightest sticks on the market (390-470 grams in a senior stick). In addition to the increased torque that these composite sticks possess, the sticks do not warp or absorb moisture like their wooden counterparts.

When the player is standing on his skates with the stick upright, on the toe, perpendicular to the ice, the top of the shaft should stop just below or above the chin, depending on personal preference. Defensemen tend to use longer sticks which provide greater reach when poke-checking.

Ice hockey sticks are also used in rinkball.

Inline hockey 
In the event of roller inline hockey, one-piece sticks are usually the same as ice hockey sticks.  But when graphite shafts are used with replacement blades, it's quite common for the replacement blades to be made of mainly fibreglass with a narrow wood core.  Fibreglass shaves down over time on concrete, sport court and blacktop surfaces where traditional wooden ice hockey replacement blades are more likely to splinter, split and/or crack on those surfaces.

Underwater hockey 

The stick (also referred to as a pusher) for underwater hockey is relatively short compared to that for field/ice/roller hockey, and should be coloured either white or black in its entirety to indicate the player's team. The shape of the stick can affect playing style and is often a very personal choice. 

A rule concerning the radiuses of projections and edges tries to address the risk that the stick might unintentionally become more of a weapon than a playing tool.

Construction materials may be of wood or plastics and current rules now supersede those that previously required sticks to be homogeneous, although they almost always are anyway.  Many players of UWH manufacture their own sticks of wood to their preferred shape and style, although there are increasingly more mass-produced designs that suit the majority (such as Bentfish, Britbat, CanAm, Dorsal, Stingray etc.) which in most cases are made of a moulded nylon or PTFE, and many styles can be obtained to suit either handedness.

The rules allow for a symmetrical double-ended stick to be used, i.e. one that may be held in either the left or the right hand, and this can give ambidextrous players the opportunity to swap hands during play, although the rules are also very clear that the stick may be held in only one hand at a time.

Modern-day Underwater Hockey (UWH) was invented as a sport originally known as Octopush in Southsea, England in 1954 and has always used short sticks or pushers similar to those described above, but a very similar game also called underwater hockey evolved some years after this in South Africa. The 'long stick' version of the game that was played largely in the southern hemisphere eventually gave way to the more widely played 'short stick' version and since about 1980, the year of the first UWH World Championship, the original 'short stick' game has been played universally around the world.

Other uses of the term 
In the cha-cha and rhumba dancing, the "hockey stick" is a figure in which the dancer moves along a straight line, with an angled turn at the end.

On aircraft liveries, a Hockey Stick is a cheatline – a line that extends along the side of an aircraft – which turns up at the end and goes up the tailfin.

References

External links 
 How hockey sticks are made video

Stick